Khashayar Carl Farmanbar (born 21 September 1976) is a Swedish entrepreneur and politician for the Social Democratic Party. Since 30 November 2021 he is the Minister for Energy and Minister for Digital Development in Magdalena Andersson's Cabinet, replacing Anders Ygeman.

Farmanbar was born in Teheran but lived in Boden after coming to Sweden at twelve years of age. He studied computer engineering and marketing at Luleå University of Technology and has worked in the IT sector. Before becoming minister, he was oppositional municipal commissioner in Nacka, where has lived since 2007.

References

21st-century Swedish engineers
Living people
1976 births
Swedish Ministers for Energy
Politicians from Tehran
Iranian expatriates in Sweden